Kumbarees is a 2019 Indian Malayalam-language film directed by Sagar Hari which was released in theaters on 23 August 2019. It stars Vijayakumar, Aswin Jose, Eldho Mathew, Ramesh Pisharody, Dharmajan Bolgatty, Shanu Bhutto, and Jenson Alapatt.

Cast

 Vijayakumar as Sub Inspector Pappan Mathew
 Ramesh Pisharody as ASI "Psycho" Ramu
 Eldho Mathew as Manu
 Aswin Jose as Shambu
 Jenson Alapatt as Anil
 Ronna Joe as Meera
 Andrea as Jincy
 Mareena Michael Kurisingal as Maria John
 Tito Wilson as John
 Dharmajan Bolgatty
 Indrans
 Ambika Mohan
 Shanu Bhutto
 Binu Adimali
 Ullas Pandalam
 Rithu Manthra

Reception
Reader Aspect said of the film, "If you like mild thriller movie, this is the film for you."

References

External links

2019 films
2010s Malayalam-language films
Indian thriller films